Men I Trust is a Canadian indie band from Montreal, Quebec. Formed in 2014, the band consists of Emmanuelle Proulx (vocals, guitar), Jessy Caron (guitar, bass), and Dragos Chiriac (keyboard). The group have self-released all of their music and have released physical editions on Canadian indie label Return to Analog. Men I Trust have independently released four studio albums, Men I Trust (2014), Headroom (2015), Oncle Jazz (2019), and Untourable Album (2021). They have also released two physical-only EPs, Men I Trust (2017) and Tailwhip (2018).

History

2014–2017: Men I Trust, Headroom, and physical EPs
Men I Trust was founded in 2014 by high school friends Jessy Caron and Dragos Chiriac, who reunited in the music department at Université Laval. They released a self-titled album in 2014 and later performed at the Montreal Jazz Festival, Quebec City Summer Festival, and M for Montreal. 

They released their second studio album Headroom in 2015. The album featured multiple vocalists, including Ghostly Kisses and Emmanuelle Proulx, who joined the group full-time as lead vocalist and guitarist in March 2016. Vocalist Odile Marmet-Rochefort also joined around this time. 

On March 3, 2016, Men I Trust released the song "Humming Man", followed by the song "Lauren" June 13. In October and November 2016, the band embarked on a China tour, playing shows in Shenzhen, Beijing, and Shanghai. After the tour, Marmet-Rochefort left the band to be a full-time member of her band De La Reine. On December 16, 2016, the band released the single "Plain View", alongside a music video made up of clips from their 2016 China Tour.

2017–2021: Oncle Jazz and Forever Live Sessions
On May 10, 2017, Men I Trust released the single "You Deserve This" alongside a music video filmed in Bucharest, Romania. This was followed by the singles "Tailwhip" on August 18, and "I Hope to Be Around" on November 10, with accompanying music videos. On February 28, 2018, they released the single "Show Me How" along with a music video. In 2018, they embarked on a North American tour. They performed at the Coachella Valley Music and Arts Festival on April 14 and 21, 2019. They also performed at Lollapalooza on August 3, 2019.

In November 29, 2018, the group announced their third studio album Oncle Jazz, which released on September 13, 2019. The album had initially been scheduled to release in February 2019, but was delayed multiple times due to the band's touring schedule and so they could ensure that it was ready. Eight of the twelve singles released since their previous album were reworked and included on this album.  

In a conversation with writer Nick Fulton for Billboard, the band noted that the green, solitary confines of rural Quebec were influential in shaping how the album sounded. Proulx stated "It put us in a really different creative mood and we were able to focus more, because there’s nothing to do outside of the house except for walking and thinking about music,” Oncle Jazz was long listed for the 2020 Polaris Music Prize.

In 2020, Men I Trust released the first live album Forever Live Sessions featuring songs from Oncle Jazz and other work. On June 16, 2021, they were featured in an episode of the NPR web series Tiny Desk (Home) Concert recorded in Quebec.

2021–present: Untourable Album
The band announced their fourth studio album Untourable Album on June 23, 2021, and it was released on August 25, 2021. It was supported by the Untourable Tour in North America which ran from September to November 2021. This was followed by the Untourable Euro Tour from May to October 2022, then an additional USA tour supported by Homeshake and Feng Suave from November to December 2022. 

On June 29, 2022, Men I Trust released the song "Hard to Let Go", the first single since the release of their previous album. This was followed by the release of the single and video for "Billie Toppy" on September 28, and the single "Girl" on October 12. In November 2022, Men I Trust performed "Show Me" with Joey Badass on The Tonight Show Starring Jimmy Fallon. In March 2023, the band began an Asia and Oceania tour.

Musical style
National Public Radio called Men I Trust an electropop band, Our Culture Mag describes the band as indie, and online music publication The Fader described their style as dream pop.

Band members

Current members
 Jessy Caron – bassist, guitarist (2014-present)
 Dragos Chiriac – keyboardist (2014-present)
 Emmanuelle "Emma" Proulx – singer, guitarist (2016-present) (Proulx has also released solo music under the name Bernache)

Current touring musicians
 Cédric Martel – bassist
 Eric Maillet – drummer

Former members
 Odile Marmet-Rochefort - vocalist

Former touring musicians
 Alexis – bassist
 Mathieu – drummer

Timeline

Discography

Albums

Studio albums

Live albums

EPs

Singles

References

External links
 
 
 
 

Musical groups established in 2014
Canadian musical trios
Musical groups from Montreal
English-language musical groups from Quebec
Canadian indie pop groups
2014 establishments in Quebec